"Say Nada" is a song recorded by the British hip hop singer and songwriter Shakka, with Jme. It was released on April 13, 2015, by RME Records as the fourth track from the solo EP, The Lost Boys. The song reached No. 75 on the UK Singles Chart.

Music video
The music video of "Say Nada" was released two weeks after the song was released.

References

External links
YouTube
Lyrics

2015 songs
2015 singles
Shakka (singer) songs
Jme (musician) songs